Symplocos oligandra is a species of plant in the family Symplocaceae. It is endemic to India.  It is threatened by habitat loss.

References

Endemic flora of India (region)
oligandra
Endangered plants
Taxonomy articles created by Polbot